The velvet flycatcher (Myiagra eichhorni) is a species of bird in the family Monarchidae.
It is endemic to New Hanover, New Ireland & New Britain.

Its natural habitats are subtropical or tropical moist lowland forests and subtropical or tropical moist montane forests.

Taxonomy and systematics
The velvet flycatcher (M. eichorni), the Dyaul flycatcher (M. cervinicolor), which is endemic to Dyaul Island, the Mussau flycatcher were formerly considered subspecies, but were reclassified as distinct species by the IOC in 2021. The three species were formerly grouped together as the velvet flycatcher under the scientific name M. hebetior.

References

velvet flycatcher
Birds of the Bismarck Archipelago
velvet flycatcher
Taxa named by Ernst Hartert